Petrovice may refer to:

Bosnia and Herzegovina
Petrovice (Kalesija), a village

Czech Republic
Petrovice (Blansko District), a municipality and village, South Moravian Region
Petrovice (Bruntál District), a municipality and village, Moravian-Silesian Region
Petrovice (Hradec Králové District), a municipality and village, Hradec Králové Region
Petrovice (Příbram District), a municipality and village, Central Bohemian Region
Petrovice (Rakovník District), a municipality and village, Central Bohemian Region
Petrovice (Třebíč District), a municipality and village, Vysočina Region
Petrovice (Ústí nad Labem District), a municipality and village, Ústí nad Labem Region
Petrovice (Ústí nad Orlicí District), a municipality and village, Pardubice Region
Petrovice (Znojmo District), a municipality and village, South Moravian Region
Petrovice (Prague), a borough of Prague
Petrovice, a village and part of Bystřice (Benešov District), Central Bohemian Region
Petrovice, a village and part of Humpolec, Vysočina Region
Petrovice, a village and part of Jablonné v Podještědí, Liberec Region
Petrovice, a village and part of Malé Svatoňovice, Hradec Králové Region
Petrovice, a village and part of Měčín, Plzeň Region
Petrovice, a village and part of Miličín, Central Bohemian Region
Petrovice, a village and part of Mladošovice, South Bohemian Region
Petrovice, a village and part of Nové Město na Moravě, Vysočina Region
Petrovice, a village and part of Osek (Strakonice District), South Bohemian Region
Petrovice, a village and part of Puklice, Vysočina Region
Petrovice, a village and part of Skorošice, Olomouc Region
Petrovice, a village and part of Štoky, Vysočina Region
Petrovice, a village and part of Týniště nad Orlicí, Hradec Králové Region
Petrovice, a village and part of Újezd (Domažlice District), Plzeň Region
České Petrovice, a municipality and village, Olomouc Region
Hraničné Petrovice, a municipality and village, Olomouc Region
Petrovice I, a municipality and village, Central Bohemian Region
Petrovice II, a municipality and village, Central Bohemian Region
Petrovice u Karviné, a municipality and village, Moravian-Silesian Region
Petrovice u Sušice, a municipality and village, Plzeň Region
Velké Petrovice, a municipality, Hradec Králové Region
Petrovice, a village and part of this municipality

Slovakia
Petrovice, Bytča District, a municipality and village

See also
Pietrowice (disambiguation)